is a city located in the western portion of Tokyo Metropolis, Japan. , the city had an estimated population of 56,786, and a population density of 5600 persons per km².

About one third of the city area is occupied by the United States Air Force Yokota Air Base, giving the city an effective population density of 8,782 persons per km2.

Geography
Fussa is approximately in the geographic center of Tokyo Metropolis, on the Musashino Terrace, bordered by the floodplains of the Tama River. The land slopes gently from north to south, with an elevation of 124 meters above sea level at the location of the city hall, which is almost at the geographic center of the city area. The highest elevation is 143.5 meters in the northeast, and the lowest is 104 meters in the southwest. The area along the river is home to many parks and almost 300 cherry blossom trees, recreational facilities and bicycle paths.

Surrounding municipalities
Tokyo Metropolis
Hamura
Akiruno
Mizuho
Tachikawa
Akishima
Musashimurayama
Hachioji

Climate
Fussa has a Humid subtropical climate (Köppen Cfa) characterized by warm summers and cool winters with light to no snowfall.  The average annual temperature in Fussa is 13.9 °C. The average annual rainfall is 1998 mm with September as the wettest month. The temperatures are highest on average in August, at around 25.3 °C, and lowest in January, at around 2.4 °C.

Demographics
Per Japanese census data, the population of Fussa increased rapidly in the 1950s and 1960s, peaking at around the year 2000 and slightly declining since.

History

The area of present-day Fussa was part of ancient Musashi Province. During the Edo period, it was tenryō territory controlled directly by the Tokugawa shogunate and administered by various hatamoto. The area was agricultural and noted for silkworms and sake production. After the Meiji Restoration, the 26 hamlets in the area consolidated into the villages of Fussa, Kumagawa and Tama within the short-lived Shinagawa Prefecture, followed by Kanagawa Prefecture. Parts of the area were involved in the Chichibu Incident of 1884.

The entire district was transferred to the control of Tokyo Metropolis on April 1, 1893, and the Ōme Railway joined Fussa to Tachikawa the following year. Fussa was elevated to town status in 1940, and an airfield for the Imperial Japanese Army was built, and became the central aircraft testing facility for the Army in 1942. During World War II, the area was only lightly bombed (once in 1945, with four casualties), and the military facilities were seized mostly intact by the American military after the war. In the post-war era, Fussa expanded rapidly through the construction of subsidized housing districts, and was elevated to city status on April 1, 1970 .

Government
Fussa has a mayor-council form of government with a directly elected mayor and a unicameral city council of 19 members. Fussa, collectively with Hamura, Akiruno, Mizuho, Hinode, Hinohara and Okutama  contributes two members to the Tokyo Metropolitan Assembly. In terms of national politics, the city is part of Tokyo 25th district of the lower house of the Diet of Japan.

Economy
Fussa, along with its neighboring cities Iruma and Tachikawa, contains a strong military presence.  A large portion of the city's economy focuses on the bases and servicing those who live there. Of note is eastern Fussa's "Bar Row" district, a historic though seedy collection of karaoke bars, shot bars, and massage parlors. The Bar Row area has been a fixture of Fussa nightlife catering to US military personnel since the 1950s. The city also serves as a bedroom community for central Tokyo and a regional commercial center.

Education
Fussa has seven public elementary schools and three public middle schools operated by the city government, and three public high schools operated by the Tokyo Metropolitan Board of Education.

Metropolitan high schools:

 
 

Municipal junior high schools:

 Fussa No. 1 (福生第一中学校)
 Fussa No. 2 (福生第二中学校)
 Fussa No. 3 (福生第三中学校)

Municipal elementary schools:

 Fussa No. 1 (福生第一小学校)
 Fussa No. 2 (福生第二小学校)
 Fussa No. 3 (福生第三小学校)
 Fussa No. 4 (福生第四小学校)
 Fussa No. 5 (福生第五小学校)
 Fussa No. 6 (福生第六小学校)
 Fussa No. 7 (福生第七小学校)

The United States Department of Defense Education Activity (DoDEA) operates the following schools on Yokota Air Base and in the municipality of Fussa for children of United States military personnel:

 Yokota High School
 Yokota Middle School

The elementary schools of Yokota AFB are in other municipalities.

Transportation

Railroad
 JR East – Ōme Line
   - 
 JR East – Hachikō Line
  
 JR East – Itsukaichi Line

Highway

Notable people from Fussa 
Mayu Sakai, Manga artist
Susumu Matsushita, illustrator
Emiri Katō, voice actress
Yuta Kanai, actor
Hiroyuki Ebihara, professional boxer
Brian Stann, mixed martial artist

See also

Yokota Air Base

References

External links

Fussa City Official Website 

 
Cities in Tokyo
Western Tokyo